Persigowa (stands for Persatuan Sepakbola Indonesia Gowa) is an Indonesian football club based in Gowa Regency, South Sulawesi, Indonesia. Persigowa currently play in Liga 3.

Players

Current squad

References

External links
 

Sport in South Sulawesi
Football clubs in Indonesia
Football clubs in South Sulawesi